Goo Bon-cheul (born October 11, 1999) is a South Korean professional football midfielder who plays for Seongnam FC of the K League 1.

Career statistics

Club

References

External links
 

1999 births
Living people
South Korean footballers
K League 1 players
Incheon United FC players
Bucheon FC 1995 players
Seongnam FC players
Association football midfielders